Czesława Stopka (21 December 1937 – 5 March 2021) was a Polish cross-country skier. She competed in three events at the 1964 Winter Olympics.

Cross-country skiing results

Olympic Games

References

External links
 

1937 births
2021 deaths
Polish female cross-country skiers
Olympic cross-country skiers of Poland
Cross-country skiers at the 1964 Winter Olympics
Sportspeople from Zakopane